Elizabeth Kemble may refer to:

Elizabeth Satchell (1763–1841), British actress who married Stephen Kemble
Elizabeth Whitlock (1761–1836), English actress and fifth child of Roger Kemble